Albert Herren (born June 8, 1952) is an American politician who represented the 6th Bristol District in the Massachusetts House of Representatives from 1985–1997.

References

1952 births
Democratic Party members of the Massachusetts House of Representatives
Politicians from Fall River, Massachusetts
Suffolk University alumni
Living people